Favites is a genus of stony corals in the family Merulinidae. Members of this genus are native to the Indo-Pacific region and their ranges extend from the Red Sea through the Indian Ocean and Western Pacific Ocean as far as Japan, the Line Islands and the Tuamotu Islands.

Characteristics
Colonies can be encrusting but are usually massive and dome-shaped. The corallites are mostly cerioid (sharing a common wall), but some are plocoid (with an individual wall) and the palliform lobes are indistinct, which distinguishes these corals from the otherwise similar Goniastrea.

Species 
The following species are currently recognized by the World Register of Marine Species :

Favites abdita  (Ellis & Solander, 1786)
Favites acuticollis  (Ortmann, 1889)
Favites chinensis  (Verrill, 1866)
Favites colemani  (Veron, 2000)
Favites complanata  (Ehrenberg, 1834)
Favites favosa  (Ellis & Solander, 1786)
Favites flexuosa  (Dana, 1846)
Favites halicora  (Ehrenberg, 1834)
Favites magnistellata  (Chevalier, 1971)
Favites melicerum  (Ehrenberg, 1834)
Favites micropentagonus  Veron, 2000
Favites monticularis  Mondal, Raghunathan & Venkataraman, 2013
Favites paraflexuosus  Veron, 2000
Favites pentagona  (Esper, 1795)
Favites rotundata  Veron, Pichon & Wijsman-Best, 1977
Favites solidocolumellae  Latypov, 2006
Favites spinosa  (Klunzinger, 1879)
Favites stylifera  Yabe & Sugiyama, 1937
Favites valenciennesi  (Milne Edwards & Haime, 1849)
Favites vasta  (Klunzinger, 1879)

Fossil record
Fossils of Favites are found in marine strata from the Jurassic to the Quaternary (age range: from 161.2 to 0.0 million years ago.).  Fossils are known from many localities in Europe, Indonesia, Philippines, Africa, North America, South America, Pakistan, Japan and India.

References 

Merulinidae
Scleractinia genera